Sara Joanne Cyzer (née Cox; born 13 December 1974) is an English broadcaster. She presented Radio 1 Breakfast on BBC Radio 1 from 3 April 2000 until 19 December 2003. Since January 2019 she now hosts the BBC Radio 2 drivetime show, Monday–Friday 4pm–7pm (formerly 5pm–7pm).

She has also presented a number of television shows for the BBC including The Great Pottery Throw Down (2015–2017), Too Much TV (2016) and Back in Time for... (2018–2020).

Early life and career 
Cox was born Sarah Joanne Cox on 13 December 1974, but later dropped the use of the letter 'h' from her first name. Her parents lived in the village of Little Lever near Bolton, Greater Manchester, where she grew up on her father's farm. She was the youngest of five children. Her parents separated when she was six or seven, after which she moved with her mother and a sister to another house in the same village. Cox attended Smithills High School until the age of 16, and left Canon Slade School after her A-levels to pursue a career in modelling. She appeared in the music video for Orchestral Manoeuvres in the Dark's 1993 single "Everyday", and on a controversial promotional poster for the 1995 video game Wipeout.

Cox won her first television show role in 1996, presenting the early "Girl Power" show The Girlie Show on Channel 4. She later had stints on Channel 5 entertainment show Exclusive and Channel 4 music programme Born Sloppy. In 1997 Cox presented on the UK feed of MTV, hosting MTV Hot, a late-night music show. In 1998 Cox won her first film role in The Bitterest Pill.

In September 1998, Cox became a presenter of The Big Breakfast, following in the footsteps of her close friend Zoe Ball.  During her time on the programme, she interviewed stars including Robbie Williams, Sting and Leonardo DiCaprio. Cox preferred to do interviews in her father's caravan, situated in The Big Breakfast garden.

BBC Radio 1

1999–2002 
A transfer to radio came on 19 September 1999 when she joined BBC Radio 1. She launched the hugely popular The Surgery with Mark Hamilton, where Cox acted as "Nurse Coxy". She also co-hosted the Saturday lunchtime show with Emma B from 13:00 – 15:00

In December 1999, it was announced that Cox would again step into Zoe Ball's shoes as presenter of Radio 1 Breakfast. Cox's breakfast show stint began on 3 April 2000. Initially, her listening figures were very good, growing from 6.9 million to 7.8 million listeners during her first fifteen months in the job—earning Radio 1 its largest breakfast audience ever—higher than that of her predecessor and ex-BBC Radio 1 DJ Chris Evans. By August 2002, however, numbers had dipped back under 7 million.

In August 2000, Cox said during a live broadcast that the Queen Mother "smelled of wee".

2003–2008
In January 2003, Cox denied rumours that she was preparing to leave the BBC for a rival show and signed a three-year contract with the public service broadcaster, tying her to the breakfast show and with the BBC for two years after that. In August 2003, the BBC again denied rumours, reported in the Daily Mail, that she had been given 10 weeks to increase ratings, or to face replacement. However, just two months later, the BBC announced that Cox, whose listening figures had slipped to 6.6 million, would be replaced by Chris Moyles in January 2004. Cox hosted her final breakfast show on 19 December 2003.

Cox then presented the afternoon "drivetime" slot, effectively swapping shows with Chris Moyles. She hosted the Drivetime show for six months with features such as "For Your Ears Only", "Me, Myself and I", and "Chap's Eye Pub Quiz" (referring to her former sidekick Mark Chapman). In June 2004, Cox began her maternity leave to give birth to a baby girl, Lola Anne. Before she returned to Radio 1 in early 2005, Scott Mills, the presenter who took over her slot during her maternity leave, was given the drivetime slot permanently.

From February 2005, Cox took over the afternoon show (13:00 – 16:00) on Saturdays and Sundays.

2008–2014
On 17 February 2008 Cox presented her last show for six months before leaving for maternity leave to have her second child. Annie Mac presented the show during her absence until Cox's return in September 2008. Cox and Annie Mac both later covered for Jo Whiley who was on maternity leave between 29 September 2008 to 20 February 2009. Following Whiley's return, Cox returned to weekends to present a Sunday mid-morning show, broadcasting between 10:00 and 13:00.

In March 2010 Cox went on maternity leave for the third time, leaving her show in the hands of the newest Radio 1 presenter, Matt Edmondson. She returned to the station on 9 August 2010 to cover for Fearne Cotton for three weeks. Cox made a self-confessed unexpected return to the breakfast show on 2 and 3 September 2010, as she sat in for the unwell Chris Moyles.

In August 2012,it was announced that Cox, Gemma Cairney, Huw Stephens, Jameela Jamil, Alice Levine, and Annie Mac would cover Fearne Cotton's show on BBC Radio 1 weekdays from 10:00 to 12:45, whilst Cotton was on maternity leave, until Cotton's return in September 2013. After Cotton's return, Cox did various cover shows; her final show for Radio 1 was on 17 February 2014.

BBC Radio 2
In June 2011, Cox began hosting the fourth series of the comedy programme Hot Gossip on BBC Radio 2, covering for Claudia Winkleman, who chose not to present the series as she was heavily pregnant at the time. in 2012, Cox has covered for Alex Lester, the late Janice Long, Ken Bruce, and Vanessa Feltz, as well as providing cover for Simon Mayo Drivetime and Steve Wright in the Afternoon.

Also between 2012 and 2018, she was the stand-in of The Radio 2 Breakfast Show covering for Chris Evans.

Cox joined BBC Radio 2 for her first regular show each Saturday night from 22:00 to midnight, presenting a 1980s decade show Sounds of the 80s to complement the weekend 1960s and 1970s decade shows The show began on Saturday 5 October 2013. The show moved to Friday nights from April 2016.

On 14 May 2018 until 13 December 2018, Cox began a new Monday-Thursday late-night show on Radio 2 from Monday to Thursday between 22:00 to midnight. She was replaced as host of Sounds of the 80s by Gary Davies; Cox presented her final edition of the show on 11 May 2018.

On 29 October 2018 it was announced that Cox would succeed Simon Mayo as drivetime presenter on 14 January 2019.

On 1 July 2022, it was announced that, in September, Cox would extend her drivetime show by an hour to run from 4–7pm to coincide with Scott Mills joining the station on permanent basis to present from 2–4pm.

Television
In July 2007, Cox presented London Live on Channel 4, and appeared as a guest star on the Sky1 show Angela and Friends in November 2009 and as guest presenter in January 2010. Also in 2010, she appeared as a team captain on What Do Kids Know? along with Rufus Hound and Joe Swash on the Watch channel.

Cox commentated for the semi-finals of the Eurovision Song Contest on BBC Three with fellow BBC Radio 1 DJ Scott Mills at the 2011 Contest and 2012 Contest, and again in 2021 as a late stand-in for Rylan Clark. Cox was replaced by Ana Matronic starting from the 2013 Contest.

On 21 October 2014, Cox guest presented a Children in Need episode of The Great British Sewing Bee.

In April 2015, it was announced that Cox would present The Great Pottery Throw Down for BBC Two. The first series began in November 2015 and the second in February 2017.

In 2016 Cox co-presenting Too Much TV, a daily magazine show on BBC Two.

In 2017, Cox appeared on Dara O Briain's Go 8 Bit and was on Steve's team in the show. She lost the episode in terms of points. On 4 June 2017, Cox co-presented the One Love Manchester benefit concert special and British television special with Ore Oduba.

Since 2018, Cox has co-presented Back in Time for..., where a modern-day family enjoy meals that were eaten by families of years gone by. She replaced Giles Coren. From May 2018, Cox presents Love in the Countryside for BBC Two.

On 5 March 2019 it was announced that Cox would host a new ITV show, entitled The Sara Cox Show, which would feature entertainment, live music and celebrity guests and which would air on Saturday and Sunday mornings.

In October 2020, Cox launched and presented Between the Covers on BBC Two, a seven-episode book programme, renewing for five series, as of December 2022.

Books
In March 2019 her book Till the Cows Come Home: A Lancashire Childhood, a memoir of growing up in 1980s Lancashire, was published by Coronet Books.

Personal life

Family
Cox married the DJ Jon Carter in October 2001. Their daughter was born on 13 June 2004. In December 2005 the couple announced their divorce.

On 16 September 2007 Cox announced, on her BBC Radio 1 weekend show, that she was expecting her second child. Cox's last weekend show was on Sunday 17 February 2008 before she left for six months' maternity leave. Her second child, a boy, was born on 10 March 2008. She returned to Radio 1 in September 2008. Cox went on maternity leave for the third time, after her show on 7 March 2010. Less than a week later, on 12 March, she announced that she had given birth to a girl.

On 23 June 2013 Cox tweeted a picture to announce she had just married her long-term boyfriend and fiancé Ben Cyzer.

Advocacy 
Cox is committed to protecting the environment. In 2009 she joined the 10:10 project in a bid to help her reduce her carbon footprint. She explained that, as she was brought up on a farm, she has no problem wearing extra layers instead of turning up the thermostat. Giving up meat was for her a different story, however, saying: "My dad is a beef farmer so he wouldn't be best pleased. I tried going veggie once, but it lasted about four hours."

In August 2014 Cox was one of 200 public figures who were signatories to a letter to The Guardian opposing Scottish independence in the run-up to September's referendum on that issue. She revealed, when taking part in a one-off celebrity special of The Crystal Maze, that she had voted against Brexit in 2016.

Privacy 
In June 2003, Cox and her ex-husband Jon received £50,000 in an out-of-court settlement from the British newspaper The People after it printed photographs of her sunbathing naked on her honeymoon in 2001. Cox, who was photographed with a telephoto lens while on a private island, initially complained to the Press Complaints Commission, who found in her favour. The People printed an apology. Cox was unsatisfied, and sued the newspaper in the High Court for a breach of her right to privacy under the Human Rights Act.

The People agreed to an out of court settlement with Cox and her ex-husband before any judgement was made. Cox received £30,000 and he £20,000, The People also agreed to pay the couple's legal costs, reported to be in excess of £100,000.

Stalking incident
In July 2017 a convicted child sex offender named Anthony Collins was convicted of stalking Cox, after sending her and her husband Ben a series of letters. He had sent the letters to her home address, which he reportedly obtained after purchasing the address for £17. He subsequently pleaded guilty to harassment and was sentenced to 16 months in prison.

Charitable activity 
Cox was one of 52 celebrities contributing to a children's story entitled Once Upon a Time to promote a new charity directory inquiries number 118 520. The book will be auctioned with the profits going to the NSPCC. Cox is also a named supporter of the animal charity PDSA, and has promoted the charity by being photographed with her pet dog, Snoop, by the late Lord Lichfield.
Cox and other celebrities entered the women's race (The Magnolia Cup) fundraising for the charity Great Ormond Street at Glorious Goodwood on 28 July 2011. She came ninth.

Cox has also been an ambassador for Centrepoint—the UK's charity for homeless young people—since 2000, making her its longest serving celebrity supporter. She takes part in the charity's flagship fundraising event, Sleep Out, every year, sleeping outside in a London location with around 800 other fundraisers. She also gives her time to Centrepoint for other events, messages of support and fundraising promotions.

In 2006, Cox participated as a celebrity showjumper in the BBC's Sport Relief event Only Fools on Horses.

From 09:30 on 20 March 2017 to 09:30 on 21 March 2017, Cox did a 24-hour danceathon on her own on BBC Radio 2, raising money for Comic Relief, Red Nose Day. She raised over £800,000 for Red Nose Day according to the commentary on television and the newspaper Manchester Evening News.

Awards and honours
In November 2006, Cox was awarded an honorary doctorate by the University of Bolton for contributions to broadcasting.

Filmography

References

External links 

Sara Cox (BBC Radio 2)
Sara Cox's Half Wower (BBC Radio 2)
Morning Live (BBC One)
Between the Covers (BBC Two)
Sara Cox's vegetable growing blog on the BBC's Dig In site

1974 births
English radio presenters
English television presenters
British women television presenters
BBC Radio 1 presenters
BBC Radio 2 presenters
People from Bolton
People educated at Canon Slade School
Living people
British women radio presenters